The 2002–03 season was UNAM's 49th season in existence and their 41st consecutive season in the top flight of Mexican football. The club participated in the Apertura and Clausura tournaments of the Mexican Primera División and in the 2003 Copa Libertadores.

UNAM had a good first semester, classifying to the playoffs as the third best team from the regular season. In the playoffs, the defeated Cruz Azul in the quarterfinals but were eliminated by Morelia at the semifinals. The next tournament, however, the Pumas had a mediocre performance, finishing 15th in the tournament.

Internationally, UNAM debuted on the Copa Libertadores. After winning the Pre Libertadores mini tournament, the team made its presentation in the continental tournament losing 2–3 against Grêmio on their first match, but managed to advance to the round of 16, being eliminated by Chilean side Cobreloa.

Players

Apertura

Clausura

Transfers

In

Out

Competitions

Overview

Torneo Apertura

League table

Matches

Playoffs

Quarterfinals

Semifinals

Torneo Clausura

League table

Matches

Copa Libertadores

Pre Libertadores
From 1998 to 2002, Mexican and Venezuelan clubs played a mini tournament known as Copa Pre Libertadores to determine two teams that would qualify to the next year's Copa Libertadores group stage. In 2002 UNAM participated in the Pre Libertadores trying to earn a spot in the 2003 edition of the tournament.

Group stage

Knockout phase

Round of 16

Statistics

Appearances and goals

Goalscorers

Hat-tricks

Own goals

References

Mexican football clubs 2002–03 season
Club Universidad Nacional seasons